This is a non-exhaustive list of El Salvador women's international footballers – association football players who have appeared at least once for the senior El Salvador women's national football team.

Players

See also 
 El Salvador women's national football team

References 

 
International footballers
El Salvador
Football in El Salvador
Association football player non-biographical articles